Unnatural Causes is a British television anthology series broadcast on ITV from 8 November to 20 December 1986.

Comprising seven stand-alone episodes, the series explored deaths in unusual circumstances. The series writers included Beryl Bainbridge, Nigel Kneale and Lynda La Plante.

This programme was produced by Central Independent Television for the ITV network.

A paperback novelisation, edited by Bainbridge, was published by Javelin Books to accompany the series.

Episodes

References

External links
 

1986 British television series debuts
1986 British television series endings
1980s British drama television series
ITV television dramas
1980s British anthology television series
1980s British crime television series
1980s British television miniseries
Television series by ITV Studios
Television shows produced by Central Independent Television
English-language television shows